Frederick Clairmonte (25 May 1886 – 20 September 1960) was a Barbadian cricketer. He played in one first-class match for the Barbados cricket team in 1909/10.

See also
 List of Barbadian representative cricketers

References

External links
 

1886 births
1960 deaths
Barbadian cricketers
Barbados cricketers
People from Saint Michael, Barbados